Skins is a British teen drama created by father-and-son television writers Bryan Elsley and Jamie Brittain for Company Pictures. The second series began airing on E4 on 11 February 2008 and ended on 14 April 2008. Like the previous series, this series follows the lives of the first generation, which consists of Tony Stonem, Michelle Richardson, Sid Jenkins, Cassie Ainsworth, Chris Miles, Jal Fazer, Maxxie Oliver and Anwar Kharral.

Main cast

List of episodes

References

External links
List of 

2008 British television seasons
Series 02

de:Liste der Skins-Episoden